The 2007 Chattanooga Mocs football team represented the University of Tennessee at Chattanooga as a member of the Southern Conference (SoCon) in the 2007 NCAA Division I FCS football season. The Mocs were led by fifth-year head coach Rodney Allison and played their home games at Finley Stadium. They finished the season 2–9 overall and 2–5 in SoCon play to place seventh.

Schedule

References

Chattanooga
Chattanooga Mocs football seasons
Chattanooga Mocs football